Baharuddin bin Abdul Latif was a Malaysian politician from PAS. He was the Member of Perak State Legislative Assembly for Gunong Semanggol from 1959 to 1964 and from 1974 to 1978. He was one of the founders and was the General-Secretary of PAS.

Family 
Baharuddin was the brother of Subky Abdul Latif. He was married to Ustazah Fatimah Hassan and had 12 children.

Activist 
Before establishing PAS, Baharuddin was active in Angkatan Pemuda Insaf (API) together with Pak Sako, Burhanuddin Helmi dan Aishah Ghani.

Death 
Baharuddin passed away at the age of 74 on 11 December 2001 in Hospital Tawakkal due to shingles.

Books

References 

Members of the Perak State Legislative Assembly
People from Perak
Malaysian Islamic Party politicians
1927 births
2001 deaths